Shrikant Verma (18 September 1931 – 25 May 1986) was an Indian poet and a Member of Parliament from Madhya Pradesh as an INC candidate from 1976 to 1982 and 1982 to 1986. Verma died of cancer in 1986 in New York.

Verma was married to Veena Verma who was also a Member of Parliament from Madhya Pradesh. Verma's son Abhishek Verma is an Indian arms dealer and was declared youngest billionaire of India in 1997.

Verma was born in Bilaspur city in the Indian state of Madhya Pradesh. He graduated from Nagpur University with a Master of Arts degree in Hindi. He has authored twenty books.

Verma was awarded Tulsi Samman for Jalsagar from Madhya Pradesh Government in 1976 and Shiksha Samman from Madhya Pradesh State Kala Parishad in 1981. In 1982, he presided over the Afro-Asian Writer's Conference hosted in New Delhi. In 1987, he was posthumously awarded the Sahitya Academy Award for Magadh.

References

External links

Hindi-language poets
Indian National Congress politicians
People from Madhya Pradesh
Recipients of the Sahitya Akademi Award in Hindi
Rajya Sabha members from Madhya Pradesh
1931 births
1986 deaths
Deaths from cancer in New York (state)
Indian National Congress politicians from Madhya Pradesh